Bruce Pungu Dombolo (born 27 May 1985) is a former French footballer.

After a brief sports career, he fell into banditry and was convicted twice for robberies, spending several years in prison. He is now an actor.

Biography

Earlier life 
Of Congolese origin, he was born in Marseille and spent his childhood in Vitrolles in the Pins district, then in Liourat.

Career 
Born in Marseille, Dombolo played for the youth side of AJ Auxerre. He transferred to Italian Serie A club A.C. Ancona and made two league appearances during the 2003–2004 season. He joined Serie C2 side Pro Vasto for the following season, but has since played for only amateur sides.

Banditry 
Back in Marseille greater area, he fell into banditry and was arrested for a first time for robbery.

After his release from prison, he sets up his own gang and commits several robberies in the region. He and his team were arrested and convicted in 2012 for the robbery of a jewelry store in a shopping mall in Puget-sur-Argens in the Var region two years earlier.

After prison 
He is a candidate in the TV show Le Grand Oral on France 2 in February 2020.

Filmography

Television 

 2021: L'Enfant de personne : Djibril
 2022: Visions : Ruben Sadri
 2022: Sage-Homme : Prince

References

External links
Profile at Lega Calcio
Profile at Foot-National.com

1985 births
Living people
French footballers
A.C. Ancona players
Footballers from Marseille
Marignane Gignac Côte Bleue FC players
Association football forwards